Amanda Miller (born December 13, 1986) is an American racing cyclist. Miller played basketball whilst at school and originally took up cycling as a means of maintaining fitness during the off-season, riding in her first race in 2005. She rode at the 2014 UCI Road World Championships. In November 2015 she was named as a member of the Visit Dallas DNA Pro Cycling team's squad for the 2016 season.

See also
2011 HTC-Highroad Women season

References

External links
 

1986 births
Living people
American female cyclists
Place of birth missing (living people)
21st-century American women